Sadick Hadji Abubakar (born 23 December 1992) is a Ghanaian professional footballer who plays as defender or defensive midfielder for Ghanaian Premier League side Bechem United F.C. He previously played for Berekum Chelsea.

Career

Berekum Chelsea 
Abubakar joined Berekum Chelsea in January 2016. He made his debut on 26 June 2016, in a 1–0 loss to Techiman City. He made 26 league appearances and scored a goal in his debut season.

Bechem United 
His performances for Berekum Chelsea attracted Ghana FA Cup winners, Bechem United who secured his services in January 2017, ahead of their 2017 CAF Confederations Cup and 2017 Ghana Premier League campaigns. At the end of his debut season for Bechem, he had played 27 league matches and scored 3 goals. His three goals came in matches against former club Berekum Chelsea, Kumasi Asante Kotoko and Elmina Sharks. His goal against Kotoko, is well remembered as he scored the goal in the 90th + 4 minutes of additional time which caused an upset and secured a 1–0 home victory for Bechem. He also featured once in the CAF Confederations Cup. The following season, he played all 15 league matches before the league was abandoned due to the dissolution of the GFA in June 2018, as a result of the Anas Number 12 Expose.

As a result of that, he joined Kuşadasıspor a lower-tier side in Turkey in late 2018. He returned to the club on a free transfer in the 2020–21 season.

Kuşadasıspor 
Abubakar secured a move to Kuşadasıspor in September 2018. The team then played in the Turkish Regional Amateur League. In his only, he played 19 league matches.

References

External links 

 
 

TTF profile

Living people
1992 births
Association football defenders
Ghanaian footballers
Berekum Chelsea F.C. players
Bechem United F.C. players
Ghana Premier League players
Ghanaian expatriate footballers
Ghanaian expatriate sportspeople in Turkey
Expatriate footballers in Turkey